Musgraves may refer to:

 Musgrave Group, an Irish food wholesaler
 The Musgraves, British roots-pop band

People with the surname Musgraves

 Dennis Musgraves (born 1943), American baseball player
 Kacey Musgraves (born 1988), American country music singer and songwriter

See also
 Musgrave (disambiguation)